Mamarazzi is a 2010 Filipino comedy film starring Eugene Domingo. It is Regal Films' first offering for its 50th anniversary.

This is also the last film appearance of actor AJ Perez, who died in a vehicular accident in Moncada, Tarlac on April 17, 2011, at the aged of 18.

Synopsis
Mamarazzi is the story of a mother who constantly pries into the lives of her three children, often resulting in riotous and hilarious situations.

Fifteen years ago, Violy Langit (Eugene Domingo), an owner of a small funeral parlor, learns that she is suffering from a medical condition that requires her to undergo a hysterectomy. All her life, she's wanted to have children; she realizes that she has to do it before the procedure. But Violy has no man in her life — no husband, no boyfriend, no suitors. She seeks the help of her best friend, Mandy (John Lapus). Out of pity and love for Violy, Mandy offers his boyfriend Carlo (Diether Ocampo) to serve as a sperm donor.

With Mandy's blessing, Violy and Carlo share a night filled with romance, passion, and mystery — for after that night, Carlo disappears completely from the lives of Violy and Mandy. But later revealed that he tried to steal Violy's money.

Violy gets her wish. She is blessed with a set of triplets — two girls, Peachy and Strawberry (Andi Eigenmann in a dual role), and one boy, Dingdong (AJ Perez) — which she raises as a single mother.

As the children gets older, Violy, with all her might, does all ways and means to have happy kids even to the extent of helping her son get the girl that he wants: Mimi (Carla Abellana). Being an extremely controlling and overly nosy mother makes her kids wonder about their mom's intentions. Little do her children know that all she's doing is to make her family happy. Adding to the children's frustration is getting her mom to reveal the real identity of their father (revealed to be a bartender she knew during her drunken stupor).

As tensions run high and emotions soar, their story explodes in a flurry of shocking, funny, and quirky revelations that forever change everyone's life.

Cast

Main cast
Eugene Domingo as Violy/Wilhelmina/Violet
John Lapus as Mandy
Diether Ocampo as Carlo
AJ Perez† as Dingdong
Carla Abellana as Mimi
Andi Eigenmann as Strawberry/Peachy

Supporting cast
Xian Lim as Oscar
Arron Villaflor as Glen
Carl Guevarra as Louie
JC Tiuseco as Ray
Lucho Ayala as Lloyd

Guest cast
 Sam Bumatay as Young Violet
 Masaki Reyes as Young Dingdong
 Alyanna Escasa as Young Strawberry
 Alyssa Escasa as Young Peachy
 Violy Villalon as Betsay
 Ignacio Espinosa as Turing

Double
 Avigail Dreje as Strawberry/Peachy's Double
 Jovelle Salcines as Strawberry's Skater-Double
 Cristina Gomera as Violy's Double
 Jelica Trasporte as Violy's Skater-Double
 Aljohn Gonzano as Dingdong's Double
 Rex Regidor as Dingdong's Stunt-Double

References

External links
 

2010 films
Philippine comedy films
2010s Tagalog-language films
2010 comedy films
Regal Entertainment films
Films directed by Joel Lamangan